The British Drag Racing Association (BDRA) was formed in June 1964 by Sydney Allard, a Ford motor dealer, hillclimbing, rally and circuit racing car driver. It later became the British Drag Racing Association & Hot Rod Association but reverted to BDRA in 1982.

It opened the first permanent drag racing strip in the UK at Santa Pod, near Bedford in 1966.

References

External links
 British Drag Racing Hall of Fame
click on Early British DragRacing/ Photo history of British drag racing from 1961 to 1975

Drag racing organizations